The Adventures of Sherlock Holmes is a collection of short stories by Sir Arthur Conan Doyle.

The Adventures of Sherlock Holmes may also refer to:

Film
Adventures of Sherlock Holmes; or, Held for Ransom, a 1905 silent film
The Adventures of Sherlock Holmes, a  1921 silent film series
The Adventures of Sherlock Holmes (film), a 1939 film

Radio
The Adventures of Sherlock Holmes (radio), an NBC radio series which aired from 1930 to 1935.
The New Adventures of Sherlock Holmes,  a radio series which aired from 1939 to 1950, first on the Blue Network and later on Mutual.

Television
The Adventures of Sherlock Holmes (1954 TV series)
The Adventures of Sherlock Holmes (1984 TV series)
The Adventures of Sherlock Holmes and Dr. Watson, a 1979-1986 Soviet TV series

Other
Sherlock Holmes (video game series), series of adventure games developed by Frogwares